Talk Radio may refer to:

Radio

Format
Talk radio, a call-in discussion format for radio broadcasts

Channels and stations
Talk Radio (XM), an XM radio channel with a talk radio format
Talkradio, a British national talk station
Talksport, a British radio station formerly called "Talk Radio"

Entertainment

Films
Talk Radio (film), a 1988 Oliver Stone film loosely based on the play and the life of Alan Berg

Plays
Talk Radio (play), a 1987 play written by Eric Bogosian

Television
"Talk Radio" (Sailor Moon), season 1, episode 3 of the anime Sailor Moon, used in the DiC/Optimum Productions English language dub